Henri Horment (3 March 1883 – 6 July 1924) was a French equestrian. He competed in the team jumping event at the 1920 Summer Olympics.

References

1883 births
1924 deaths
French male equestrians
Olympic equestrians of France
Equestrians at the 1920 Summer Olympics
Sportspeople from Pyrénées-Atlantiques